Punctate keratoderma may refer to:
 Spiny keratoderma
 Keratosis punctata palmaris et plantaris

Palmoplantar keratodermas